From List of National Natural Landmarks, these are the National Natural Landmarks in Puerto Rico.  There are 5 in total.

See also

List of National Historic Landmarks in Puerto Rico

References
  

Puerto Rico
Puerto Rico geography-related lists